Eschscholzia glyptosperma is a species of poppy known by the common names desert gold poppy, desert golden poppy, and Mojave poppy.

It is native to the Mojave Desert and Sonoran Deserts of the Southwestern United States, in California, southern Nevada, western Arizona, and southwestern Utah.

Distribution
Eschscholzia glyptosperma is an annual herb growing from a basal patch of leaves divided into pointed segments.

It produces erect stems up to about 25 centimeters in height, each bearing a single flower. The poppy flower is bright yellow, with petals one to two and a half centimeters long. It blooms from March to May.

The fruit is a capsule 4 to 7 centimeters long filled with tiny rounded brown seeds.

References

External links
CalFlora Database: Eschscholzia glyptosperma (desert gold poppy, desert golden poppy)
 Jepson Manual eFlora (TJM2) treatment of Eschscholzia glyptosperma
USDA Plants Profile for Eschscholzia glyptosperma (desert gold poppy)
UC Photos gallery — Eschscholzia glyptosperma

glyptosperma
Flora of the California desert regions
Flora of Baja California
Flora of the Sonoran Deserts
Natural history of the Colorado Desert
Natural history of the Mojave Desert
Annual plants
Flora without expected TNC conservation status